From the Earth to the Moon: A Direct Route in 97 Hours, 20 Minutes is an 1865 novel by Jules Verne. It tells the story of the Baltimore Gun Club, a post-American Civil War society of weapons enthusiasts, and their attempts to build an enormous  Columbiad space gun and launch three people—the Gun Club's president, his Philadelphian armor-making rival, and a French poet—in a projectile with the goal of a Moon landing. Five years later, Verne wrote a sequel called Around the Moon.

The story is also notable in that Verne attempted to do some rough calculations as to the requirements for the cannon and in that, considering the comparative lack of empirical data on the subject at the time, some of his figures are remarkably accurate. However, his version of a space gun for a non-rocket spacelaunch turned out to be impractical for safe human space travel since a much longer barrel would have been required to reach escape velocity while limiting acceleration to survivable limits for the passengers.

The character of Michel Ardan, the French member of the party in the novel, was inspired by the real-life photographer Félix Nadar.

Plot

The story opens some time after the end of the American Civil War. The Baltimore Gun Club, a society dedicated to the design of weapons of all kinds (especially cannons), comes together when Impey Barbicane, its president, calls them to support his latest idea. He's done some calculations, and believes that they could construct a cannon capable of shooting a projectile to the Moon. After receiving the support of his companions, another meeting is held to decide the place from which the projectile will be fired, the dimensions and materials of both the cannon and the projectile, and which kind of powder they are to use.

An old enemy of Barbicane, a Captain Nicholl of Philadelphia, designer of plate armor, declares that the entire enterprise is absurd and makes a series of bets with Barbicane, each of them of increasing amount, over the impossibility of such a feat.

The first obstacle, enough money to construct the giant cannon (and against which Nicholl has bet $1,000), is raised from a number of countries in America and Europe. Notably, the U.S. donates four million dollars, whilst England, at first, does not give anything. In the end, nearly five and a half million dollars are raised, which ensures the financial feasibility of the project.

Stone's Hill in "Tampa Town", Florida is chosen as the site for the cannon's construction.

During a meeting between Ardan, the Gun Club, and the inhabitants of Florida, Nicholl appears and challenges Barbicane to a duel. The duel is stopped when Ardan—having been warned by J. T. Maston, secretary of the Gun Club—meets the rivals in the forest where they have agreed to duel.  Meanwhile, Barbicane finds the solution to the problem of surviving the incredible acceleration that the explosion would cause. Ardan suggests that Barbicane and Nicholl travel with him in the projectile, and his proposition is accepted.

In the end, the projectile is successfully launched, but the destinies of the three astronauts are left inconclusive. The sequel, Around the Moon, deals with what happens to the three men during their voyage from the Earth to the Moon.

Influence on popular culture
The novel influenced the opera Le voyage dans la lune in 1875, with music by Jacques Offenbach.

In 1880 The Pall Mall Gazette described Verne’s Columbiad as a  ‘space-ship’ - the first recorded use of this term in history.

In H. G. Wells' 1901 novel The First Men in the Moon (also relating to the first voyagers to the Moon) the protagonist, Mr. Bedford, mentions Verne's novel to his companion, Professor Cavor, who replies (in a possible dig at Verne) that he does not know what Bedford is referring to. Verne returned the dig later when he pointed out that he used gun cotton to send his men to the Moon, an actual substance. "Can Mr. Wells show me some 'cavourite'?", he asked archly.

The novel (along with Wells' The First Men in the Moon) inspired the first science fiction film, A Trip to the Moon, made in 1902 by Georges Méliès. In 1958, another film adaptation of this story was released, titled From the Earth to the Moon. It was one of the last films made under the RKO Pictures banner. The story also became the basis for the very loose adaptation Jules Verne's Rocket to the Moon (1967), a caper-style British comedy starring Burl Ives and Terry-Thomas. The 1961 Czechoslovak film The Fabulous Baron Munchausen combines characters and plot elements from the Verne novel with those of the stories of Baron Munchausen and Cyrano de Bergerac.

In 1889 Verne wrote a second sequel to the novel, The Purchase of the North Pole, which has the Gun Club members (led by J. T. Maston) plan to use the Columbiad to alter the tilt of the Earth to enable the mineral wealth of the Arctic region to be put within reach of exploitation.

In March 1953, the Gilberton Company published a comic-book adaptation of From the Earth to the Moon as issue No. 105 in its Classics Illustrated series.  An unidentified scriptwriter combined Verne's From the Earth to the Moon with the sequel, Around the Moon. Gilberton art director Alex A. Blum supplied both the cover painting and the 44 pages of interior art. The title went through twelve printings between 1953 and 1971.

During their return journey from the Moon, the crew of Apollo 11 made reference to Jules Verne's book during a TV broadcast on 23 July. The mission's commander, astronaut Neil Armstrong, said, "A hundred years ago, Jules Verne wrote a book about a voyage to the Moon. His spaceship, Columbia , took off from Florida and landed in the Pacific Ocean after completing a trip to the Moon. It seems appropriate to us to share with you some of the reflections of the crew as the modern-day Columbia completes its rendezvous with the planet Earth and the same Pacific Ocean tomorrow."

In Back to the Future Part III, Clara Clayton in 1885 asks Emmett Brown if he believes mankind will ever "travel to the Moon the way we travel across the country on trains". Being from the future, Brown already knows that doesn't happen for another 84 years, but he affirms they will while inadvertently quoting a passage of From the Earth to the Moon. Clara calls him out on this, and it's from this encounter that the pair discovers their mutual love of Jules Verne novels.

100 years after the sequel, 1989's A Grand Day Out chronicles a trip to the moon by Wallace and Gromit, an inventor and his dog, which was a homage to the Jules Verne story.

The novel and its sequel were the inspiration for the 2005 point-and-click adventure computer game Voyage: Inspired by Jules Verne.

In the 2010 The Quantum Thief trilogy, the protagonist enters an uneasy alliance with the "Gun Club zoku", who specialize in military weaponry, and in The Causal Angel (2014) after escaping Earth using a nuclear powered space gun, sells the "Verne gun bullet" to them as a unique collectible item; author Hannu Rajaniemi is a fan of Verne.

The Japanese anime adaption of the Space Brothers (2012-2014) opening for episodes 39-51 ("Small World" by Fujifabric) was a parody of the story, even ending with the cover of an early English translation.

The Japanese otome visual novel, Code: Realize- Guardian of Rebirth (2014), features a datable engineer named Impey Barbicane. Impey's goal is to build the technology to reach the moon, reflecting the story of the novel.

In season two of The Umbrella Academy (TV series), the character Ray gives Allison a copy of the book as an anniversary gift. Later she leaves a note for him in the same copy of the book.

Disneyland Paris

The first incarnation of the roller coaster Space Mountain in Disneyland Paris, named Space Mountain: De la Terre à la Lune, was based loosely on this novel. The attraction opened in 1995. The attraction's exterior was designed using a Verne era retro-futuristic influence. Elements of the ambiance include rivet and boiler plate effect and the "Columbiad", which recoils with a bang and produces smoke as the train passes, giving riders the perception of being shot into space. During 2005, the ride was refurbished and renamed Space Mountain: Mission 2 as part of the Happiest Celebration on Earth. After this, the ride no longer featured elements of the original storyline from the novel, as it was opened again in 2017 with Star Wars theme.

In 1995 the BBC made a documentary about the creation of Space Mountain, called Shoot For The Moon. The 44-minute program followed Tim Delaney and his team in bringing the book From the Earth to the Moon by Jules Verne to life. The program shows the development of the attraction, from conception to construction to testing the final attraction. The documentary, originally broadcast on BBC Two in the United Kingdom, was also aired on other channels in many countries.

Project Epicus version
In 2013, a new film version of the story was announced, under the banner of Project Epicus—a film project—with the full blessing of Jules Verne's great-grandson Jean Verne that began production in 2017.

See also

Around the Moon (1870 sequel)
The First Men in the Moon, 1901 novel by H.G. Wells
Apollo 8
Apollo 11
Verneshot
Moon in science fiction
Amédée Guillemin
Apollo command and service module, the US lunar spacecraft whose dimensions were "predicted" by Verne's novel
Project HARP
Project A119

References

External links

 
 —This is the original translation of Mercier and King published by Sampson Low et al. in 1873 and deletes about 20% of the original French text, along with numerous other errors.
 —Gut. text #83 in HTML format with original illustrations.
 —This the version of both parts of Earth to the Moon and Round the Moon as published by Ward Lock in London in 1877. The translation is more complete than the Mercier version, but still has flaws, referring to the space capsule as a "bullet".
 , an analysis and comparison to Apollo.
 .
 .
 .
 

 
1865 French novels
1865 science fiction novels
Fictional rivalries
French novels adapted into films
French science fiction novels
French novels adapted into television shows
Novels by Jules Verne
Novels set in Florida
Novels set on the Moon
Space exploration novels
Science fiction novels adapted into films